Strigilodelima is a genus of gastropods belonging to the family Clausiliidae.

The species of this genus are found in the Balkans.

Species:

Strigilodelima conspersa 
Strigilodelima pentheri

References

Clausiliidae